A Place in the Sun is a 2019 South Korean television series starring Oh Chang-seok, Yoon So-yi, Choi Sung-jae and Ha Si-eun.

Plot
A man assumes a new identity after a near-death car accident to seek revenge.

Cast

Main characters
Oh Chang-seok as Oh Tae-yang / Kim Yoo-wol
Choi Seung-hoon as young Tae-yang / Yoo-wol
Yoon So-yi as Yoon Si-wol
Choi Sung-jae as Choi Gwang-il
Ha Si-eun as Chae Deok-sil

Supporting
 Lee Deok-hee as Jang Jeong-hee, Chairman's eldest daughter, Gwangil's mother and Taeyang's birth mother. CEO of Yangji Fashion.
 Son Seong-yoon as young Jang Jeong-hee

References

External links 
  
 
 

Korean Broadcasting System television dramas
2019 South Korean television series debuts
2019 South Korean television series endings
Korean-language television shows
Television series by Samhwa Networks